Meister or Master Gerhard ( allegedly in Reil – 24 or 25 April 1271 in Cologne) was the first master mason of Cologne Cathedral. He was also known as Gerhard von Rile or by the Latin version of his name, Meister Gerardus.

He fell to his death during construction of the cathedral.

Bibliography 
 Paul Clemen (ed.): Der Dom zu Köln (= Die Kunstdenkmäler der Rheinprovinz. Band 6, Teil III). Reprint der 2., vermehrten Auflage, Düsseldorf, 1938. Düsseldorf Schwann 1980, 
 Johann Jakob Merlo: Geschichte der Kölner Dombaumeister (= Nr. 75 der Jahrbücher des Vereins von Alterthumsfreunden im Rheinlande), 1883
 Johann Jakob Merlo: Nachrichten von dem Leben und den Werken kölnischer Künstler, S.133 Köln 1850
 Heinrich Pröhle: Meister Gerhard von Rile, des Kölner Domes Baumeister, in: Rheinlands schönste Sagen und Geschichten. Berlin 1886, S. 213-216 (E-Text)
 
 Sulpiz Boisserée: Meister Gerhard, muthmaßlicher Baumeister des Doms v. Köln. (Geschichte u. Beschreibung des Doms v. Köln). In: Kunstblatt Nr. 13 (1824)
 Max Hasak: Der Dom zu Köln, Berlin 1911, S. 55ff online

References

1210 births
1271 deaths
German architects
Gothic architects
13th-century architects
Accidental deaths from falls